Joey Lussick (born 28 December 1995) is an Australian professional rugby league footballer who plays as a  for the St Helens in the Betfred Super League.

He previously played for the Manly Warringah Sea Eagles and the Parramatta Eels in the NRL, and the Salford Red Devils in the Super League.

Background
Lussick was born in Freshwater, New South Wales, Australia. He is the younger brother of former Sea Eagles teammate Darcy Lussick and son of former Sea Eagles player Jason Lussick.

Lussick played his junior rugby league for the Beacon Hill Bears, and rugby union for Newington College and the Australian Schoolboys rugby league and union team before being signed by the Parramatta Eels.

Playing career

Early career
In late 2013, Lussick played for the Australian Schoolboys. In 2014 and 2015, he played for the Parramatta Eels' NYC team. During 2015, he made a mid-season switch to the Sydney Roosters. In 2016, he graduated to the Roosters' Intrust Super Premiership NSW team, Wyong Roos.

2017
In 2017, Lussick joined the Manly Warringah Sea Eagles. In round 20 of the 2017 NRL season, he made his NRL debut for the Sea Eagles against the St. George Illawarra Dragons, playing alongside his brother Darcy and scoring a try.

2018
In 2018, Lussick joined English side, the Salford Red Devils for the rest of the season in their aim to remain in the Super League during the Middle 8s. His existing footballing relationship with fellow new Red Devil Jackson Hastings, having played Australian schoolboys as well as at the Roosters and Manly with Hastings, was said to be an added bonus according to Head Coach Ian Watson, as was his adaptability to play anywhere in the spine.

2019
Lussick was part of the Salford side which surprised many by reaching the 2019 Super League Grand Final against St Helens.  Salford went into the game looking to win their first championship since 1976 but faced a St Helens team which had only lost 3 games all season.  Lussick played in the final which was won by St Helens by a score of 23–6 at Old Trafford.

2020
On 22 October, Lussick signed a one-year deal to join NRL side Parramatta for the 2021 NRL season.

2021
In round 11 of the 2021 NRL season, Lussick made his club debut for Parramatta in their 28-6 loss against Manly-Warringah.

On 16 September, he signed a three-year deal to join English side St Helens RFC.
Lussick made a total of nine appearances for Parramatta in the 2021 NRL season.  He did not feature in the club's finals campaign.  On 22 September, he was officially released by the Parramatta club.

2022
In round 1 of the 2022 Super League season, Lussick made his club debut for St Helens R.F.C. where they defeated Catalans Dragons 28-8.
On 24 September, Lussick played from the interchange bench in St Helens 24-12 Grand Final victory over Leeds.

2023
On 18 February 2023, Lussick played in St Helens 13-12 upset victory over Penrith in the 2023 World Club Challenge.

References

External links

Salford Red Devils profile
SL profile
Manly Warringah Sea Eagles profile

1995 births
Living people
Australian rugby union players
Australian rugby league players
Australian expatriate sportspeople in England
Manly Warringah Sea Eagles players
Parramatta Eels players
People educated at Newington College
Rugby league hookers
Rugby league players from Sydney
Salford Red Devils players
St Helens R.F.C. players
Wyong Roos players